Henbury is a district of Bristol, England, formerly a village in Gloucestershire.

Henbury may also refer to:

Places 
in Australia
Henbury Meteorites Conservation Reserve, Northern Territory; contains the Henbury craters field
Henbury Station, Northern Territory
Henbury School - a school for disabled children in Darwin - refer List of schools in the Northern Territory#Other state schools
in England
Henbury, a district of Bristol
Henbury School
Henbury railway station
Henbury Hundred, a hundred of Gloucestershire
Henbury, Cheshire
Henbury High School
Henbury, Dorset

Other 
Henbury (crater), on Mars